In enzymology, a Cd2+-exporting ATPase is an enzyme that catalyzes the chemical reaction

ATP + H2O + Cd2+in  ADP + phosphate + Cd2+out

The 3 substrates of this enzyme are ATP, H2O, and Cd2+, whereas its 3 products are ADP, phosphate, and Cd2+.

This enzyme belongs to the family of hydrolases, specifically those acting on acid anhydrides to catalyse transmembrane movement of substances. The systematic name of this enzyme class is ATP phosphohydrolase (Cd2+-exporting).

Structural studies 

References 

 
 

EC 3.6.3
Enzymes of known structure